The Big Show is the ninth Our Gang short subject comedy released. The Our Gang series (later known as "The Little Rascals") was created by Hal Roach in 1922, and continued production until 1944.

Plot
After being chased away from the county fair, the gang decides to open their own junior version of the fair, complete with wild animal displays, rides, and animal stunts. To top it off, they give a live performance set inside a giant movie frame, and impersonate several popular film stars of the day.

Notes
When the television rights for the original silent Pathé Our Gang comedies were sold to National Telepix and other distributors, several episodes were retitled. This film was released into TV syndication as Mischief Makers in 1960 under the title "County Fair". About two-thirds of the original film was included.

The second half of the film features a sequence with a handful of the "Our Gang" kids impersonating various popular movie stars of the day. Hal Roach had the idea for this scene after auditioning newcomer Andy Samuel. Andy decided to show Roach his impersonation of Charlie Chaplin; he also does his Chaplin impersonation in this film. In addition, Mickey Daniels imitates Douglas Fairbanks, Jack Davis imitates William S. Hart, Mary Kornman impersonates Mary Pickford, an unidentified kid impersonates Harold Lloyd, and Ernest Morrison imitates Uncle Tom (from the play Uncle Tom's Cabin).

Cast

The Gang
 Joe Cobb as Joe
 Jackie Condon as Jackie
 Mickey Daniels as Mickey / Douglas Fairbanks
 Jack Davis as Jack / William S. Hart
 Allen Hoskins as Farina
 Mary Kornman as Mary / Mary Pickford
 Ernie Morrison as Booker T. / Uncle Tom
 Richard Billings as Muggsy
 Andy Samuel as Andy / Charlie Chaplin

Additional cast
 Elmo Billings as Kid at fair
 Roy Brooks as De Rues
 Dick Gilbert as Security guard
 Dinah the Mule as Herself

External links

1923 films
Hal Roach Studios short films
American silent short films
American black-and-white films
Films directed by Robert F. McGowan
1923 comedy films
Our Gang films
1923 short films
1920s American films
Silent American comedy films
1920s English-language films